The Fourth Legacy is the fourth full-length album by power metal band Kamelot. It was released in 1999 by Noise Records/Modern Music. It is the first album to credit vocalist Roy Khan as a writer on all tracks, establishing him as the main songwriter of the band together with founder and guitarist Thomas Youngblood.

Track listing
All tracks are written by Roy Khan and Thomas Youngblood, except where noted.

Personnel
All information from the album booklet.

Kamelot
Roy Khan – vocals
Thomas Youngblood – guitars, backing vocals
Glenn Barry – bass guitar
Casey Grillo – drums

Additional musicians
Miro – keyboards and orchestral arrangements, producer
Sascha Paeth – additional guitars
Thomas Rettke – background vocals on "Nights of Arabia", "Until Kingdom Come" and "Alexandria"
Dirk Bruinenberg – additional drums
Robert Hunecke-Rizzo – additional drums
Rannveig Sif Sigurdardóttir – backing vocals on "A Sailorman's Hymn"
Cinzia Rizzo – female vocals on "Nights of Arabia"
Farouk Asjadi – flute and additional percussion on "Desert Reign"
Andre Neygenfind – double bass on "Nights of Arabia"
Fallersleben String Quartet – strings
Simon McTavish – flute

Production
Sascha Paeth – producer, mixing, mastering
Derek Gores – cover art, design
Thomas Kuschewski – photography

See also
 Scheherazade in popular culture
 Alexandria

References

External links
 

1999 albums
Kamelot albums
Noise Records albums